The Council on International Educational Exchange (CIEE) is a non-profit organization promoting international education and exchange. It was founded in 1947 and is based in the United States. The organization is headquartered in Portland, Maine.

Programs
CIEE operates over 175 study abroad programs in over 40 countries and teaching programs in Chile, China, Spain, and Thailand. Summer seminars in 29 countries are available. As the largest sponsor of J-1 visa programs, CIEE organizes seasonal work experiences in the United States for approximately 45,000 university students each year through its Work & Travel USA program. It also organizes high school exchange programs for students in the United States as well as more than 30 countries around the world.

CIEE also maintains a membership community, the CIEE Academic Consortium. Academic institutions join the consortium in order to affiliate with CIEE's mission, to support CIEE's advocacy efforts in Washington and other world capitals, and to have a policy voice in CIEE's educational programs and activities. As such, CIEE Members are part of a worldwide network of colleges and universities.

Among others, CIEE established the Council Study Centre at Vietnam National University, which receives about 50 students from various countries learning Vietnamese language and other sciences, and Study Center in Khon Kaen, Thailand.

History
One of the major goals after World War II was to develop international understanding and establish trust between nations. The development of student and teacher travel was considered the most effective tool to achieve that goal.  As Senator J. William Fulbright said, “Educational exchange can turn nations into people, contributing as no other form of communication can to the humanizing of international relations” (Fulbright, 1994). In the United States, a number of organizations and religious groups became immediately interested in re-establishing various types of educational exchange programs that had 
been suspended in 1939 at the beginning of the war.

There was a strong political rationale for the U.S. government to support student travel abroad programs. Students were seen as “ambassadors” of their own country who would represent the best national interests of the American society abroad and promote international understanding. At the same time, development of student travel abroad for educational and cultural purposes preserved a strong academic interest resulting from broadening the horizons of the younger generation and educating them through exchanges for cross-cultural and international competence.

In 1946, the international situation and the shortage of ships in trans-Atlantic service did not permit such travel, but in 1947 many organizations endeavored to send exchange students abroad to conferences, work camps, and study seminars. It was recognized that special provisions would need to be made for U.S. student groups going to Europe during the summer seasons and that only joint efforts could be undertaken in order to pursue this 
goal.

Prior to May 1947, representatives of a number of educational agencies had been negotiating with the U.S. Department of State about the possibility of utilizing troop transports for the re-establishment of educational travel and exchange programs during the summer of 1947. In April 1947, at the request of the Department of State, the Maritime Commission agreed to assign two C-4 Troop ships to be used for sending U.S. students on exchange programs to Europe that summer.  The United States Lines and the Moore-McCormick Line were asked to serve as general agents for these vessels (although 
at a later date the Moore-McCormick Line was dropped and the United States Lines took full responsibility for the operation of the vessels).

The Department of State was given the responsibility for determining which organizations and which students would be permitted to travel abroad on these ships.  On October 21, 1948, 45 U.S., Western European, and international organizations (including UNESCO, U.S. Office of Education, World Federation of Education Associations, U.S. National Student Association, National Student YMCA, and YMCA) met to discuss the Student Ship Project.

A group of leaders from the organizations most directly concerned secured government action to set aside special student ships, and formed themselves into an Executive Committee which would allocate space and administer the shipboard orientation programs. That effort gave way to the future Council on International Educational Exchange (CIEE), the leading and oldest U.S. non-governmental organization in the field of international education and student study abroad.

In 1967, CIEE started the first academic exchange between the United States and the Soviet Union. It was situated at Leningrad University. Graduates of the program include Michael McFaul, the United States Ambassador to Russia from 2012 to 2014.

In April 2016, CIEE and The University of Pennsylvania Graduate School for Education Center for Minority Serving Institutions announced a joint $100,000 scholarship and three-year partnership to increase study abroad opportunities for students of color.

CIEE Alumni Global Network
The CIEE Alumni Global Network is a group of more than 350,000 alumni from all CIEE programs, living and working in over 176 countries around the world. This includes past participants of CIEE Study Abroad, Teach Abroad, Work and Travel USA, Congress-Bundestag Youth Exchange, High School Abroad, Baltic-American Freedom Foundation, and more.

The CIEE Alumni Global Network has many notable alumni, including U.S. ambassadors and leaders in international exchange.

References

External links
CIEE Home Page
CIEE Alumni Global Network
Information about CIEE abroad program in Spain

Organizations established in 1947
Educational organizations based in the United States
Charities based in Maine
Organizations based in Portland, Maine
1947 establishments in New York (state)